This is a list of places of interest and historical significance in Kozhikode (Calicut).

Kozhikode Beach

Calicut beach is the most popular retreat for locals. This shore has been a witness to many historic events, including pitched naval battles and the arrival of ships from distant lands. Uddanda, a Sanskrit poet in Zamorin's court, wrote in his Kokila Sandeśa: "The ocean, the father of the goddess of riches [Indira is a synonym of Lakshmi] seeing that his daughter has settled down in Kukkatakroda [Sanskrit for Kozhikode], is embracing the place, presenting it with shipful of jewels". Several national leaders like Mahatma Gandhi, Khan Abdul Ghaffar Khan, Indira Gandhi and Krishna Menon have addressed people here. The 'Beach Road' was renamed Gandhi Road from Evan's Road after Mahatma Gandhi's visit in January 1934. Two dilapidated piers can be seen extending into the sea. The 'Iron Screw-pile' pier to the north was built in 1871,  with a 'T' end. Numerous cranes on these piers once loaded spices and other goods destined to foreign ports like Aden, Genoa, Oslo, London, Bremen, Hamburg, New York City etc.

Near the northern pier is a park maintained by the Lions club, a children's park, the lighthouse with a seafarer's memorial and a marine aquarium. Further north to the Lions' Park is a dirty fishing area where once was located a French loge with factories and French settlements. Near the south pier is a place called 'Horse's Jumping Point' where horses brought from Gujarat and Arabia were made to jump into the water, swim and would gallop along the shore and be displayed for sale. The beach offers a pleasant view at times of fishermen entering the sea with their tiny boats, fighting the waves and returning with their catch.

Veliyangadi (big bazaar)
Veliyangadi is not a typical 'place of interest' to visit. The noise, rush and heat of this narrow lane would test any visitor's mettle. Nevertheless, not many streets can boast a 600-year-old history and still be functioning as one of the main commercial centre of a city. In spite of creeping signs of modernity over hundreds of years, this crowded part of the city offers the best chance to visualize daily life at a commercial hub in medieval Calicut. Muslim, Jain and Hindu seths, Gujarathi and Marwari moneylenders and Tamil and Andhra Chettis can be seen busy with their businesses, as they did for centuries. Merchants and accountants still use a unique system of finger-code language as noted by Ma Huang of Zheng He's fleet in 1403. The legend has it that the first secretary of the Zamorin, Mangat Achan, after a long penance had the goddess of wealth Lakshmi appear before him. He then made her promise to wait until he returned but went home and committed suicide. Unable to break her promise, it is said, Lakshmi stayed permanently in Veliyangadi.

Mananchira and nearby institutions

Mananchira is a large tank in the heart of the city. Mananchira or Mana Vikraman Tank (Manan or Mana Vikraman being the Coronation name of the Zamorins) seems to have been the drinking water source for the entire Palace complex (previously located at the Kottaparambu Women and Children Hospital). Surrounding the Mananchira are several important institutions. The Town Hall was constructed in 1891 by the salt merchants (previously called Salt Abkari Town Hall) and has been an important stage for several popular agitations and ceremonies during the freedom movement and thereafter. The Pattalapalli or 'Military Mosque' was originally built for the Mysore soldiers who had surrounded the Palace during the 'Mysore invasion'. The Comtrust Textile Factory (previously the Commonwealth Weaving Factory) was established in 1884 by the Basel Mission from Germany. To the western side of Mananchira is located the C.S.I. Church, Basel Mission Complex and the BEM (Basel Evangelical Mission) Girls' School (1848). Once the main courtyard of the Zamorin Ruler's palace, the Mananchira ground along with the older Ansari Park (named after the freedom fighter Ansari) has been developed into a well- maintained park called 'Mananchira Square'. It has a green carpet lawn fenced with laterite- sculpted walls. The entire complex is circled by 250 lamp posts designed in 'colonial' style. The 'Square' has an artificial stream, a musical fountain, an open-air theatre and a music stage. There is a public library near mananchira square which has a collection of huge variety of books. Books from all disciplines are available here. Malabar Palace, one of the first star hotels in Malabar is also located here.

S.M. Street
S.M. Street is a buzzing shopping and commercial lane immediately north of Mananchira Square. The name Sweetmeat is thought to have been derived from a kind of sweet (locally called 'halwa') which was called 'sweetmeat' by European traders. S.M. Street, like the lanes of Veliyangadi, is about 600 years old and was most likely occupied by the residences and shops of sweet manufacturers from Gujarath. A now-abandoned Parsi cemetery called Anjuman, most likely built in the 17th century, is located here and finds mention in William Logan's Malabar.

Regional Science Centre and Planetarium

Sarovaram Biopark

Sarovaram is an eco-friendly bio-park in Kozhikode city. It is a project meant for conservation of the wetlands through eco-friendly tourism interventions by sustainable methods. This is one of the 27 wetlands of natural importance identified by the Government of India for conservation under National Wetland conservation program. The wetlands are rich with 7 mangrove spices, 29 mangrove associates and fauna ranging from protozoa to Otter. It is also a congenial habitat for 20 types of water birds, 2 bird associated with water, 3 birds associated with waterlogged reeds and 9 land birds. The 11 km long canal connects Korappuzha and Kallai rivers and brings in periodic influx of saline water which makes the habitat ideal for mangrove, fisheries and other biota. The major components of the project are canal walkway, boating facilities, Otter Park, Butterfly Park, bird sanctuary, aquarium, coracles, floating rafts, board-walk, park/ musical fountain, open-air theatre, Interpretation centre etc.

Tali Siva Temple

The Tali Siva temple was one of the two Brahmanical royal temples patronized by the Zamorin (the other being the Valayanaattu Kavu) and to this day remains one of the most important spiritual and cultural centres in Kozhikode. The temple's date of origin is uncertain but was most likely built during the foundation of the city itself in the 12th century or before. The temple is surrounded by gigantic walls of 'elephant belly' (aana palla) type with broad base and narrower neck at the top. One of the two tanks attached to the temple can be seen to the right. The temple hosts the annual 'competition for scholars' called Revathi Pattathanam attended by eminent scholars and philophers of Bharatiya Mimamsa, Prabhakara Mimamsa, Vedanta Mimamsa and Vyakarana. The temple was also the site for the famous anti-caste agitation of 1911 organized by Krishna Vakil (editor of Mithavadi) and advocate Manjeri Rama Ayyar for the rights of 'low-caste' people to use the road between the tank and the temple.

Mishkal Mosque
Mishkal Mosque is one of the oldest mosques in Kerala. The Mosque was built by an Arab merchant, Nakhooda Mishkal, nearly 650 years ago. It is named Mishkal Mosque after him. It is located in Kuttichira, a part of Thekkepuram region in Kozhikode city. In 1510, the mosque was partially burned in a Portuguese attack. The top floors of the mosque still display some of that damage. Mishkal Mosque originally had five stories. It was reconstructed after the fire in 1510 and now has four stories. Typical for similarly aged mosques of the region, it has no cupolas and minarets and heavily employs timber. According to some historians, Kerala’s temple architecture influenced the architecture of old mosques in Kerala which have gopuram-style entrance arches and no minarets.

Panniyankara Bhagavati Temple
The Bhagavaty temple on a hillock on the southern side of Kallayi river is one of the two pre-Calicut temples known to historians, built at least two centuries before the foundation of the city. This area must have come under the territory of Porlathiri during the reign of Ceraman Perumal. It is a typical Chera period structure with a square garbhagriha and mandapa and probably had a currambalam and prakara (outer walls) that are no more. Two granite slabs dating to the 10–11th century AD were recovered recently carrying three inscriptions in Vattezhuthu, an old Malayalam language. One is a record of a land grant of the Chera king Ravi Kota, who was crowned in 1021 AD. Mentioned in the inscription are functionaries like Adhikarar (officials), Alkoyil (king's representative) and Poduval (temple secretary) and avirodham (a system of unanimous resolution), kalam (an old measure), etc. The second inscription dating back to 883–913 AD records a decision by the Taliyar and Tali Adhikarikal of 'Panriyankarai' to conduct seven Tiruvakkiram (sacred feast) at the shrine of Patari (female deity). The third inscription records a unanimous decision to transfer some land belonging to the daughter of the Chief Queen of Cheraman Perumal for the conduct of Tiru amritu (sacred feast).

Thiruvannur Siva Temple
This Siva temple has an apsidal garbhagriha, decorated with typical Chola pillars and pilasters, panjaras and vyalimukhas. The central shrine has escaped any repair or change and is relatively well preserved. An inscription unearthed records a land grant given to Tirumannur Patarakar in the eighth regnal year of Raja Raja Chola. The record has been dated to 1044 AD. The deity appears to have been a Jain Tirthankara (since the rules of Thirukkunavaye, the premier Jain shrine of Kerala in Kodungalloor, are cited in the punitive clauses). The Jain temple must have been converted into a Siva temples sometime in the 11th century before the arrival of the Zamorins. The apsidal shrine and other features are attributable to this period.

Kappad Beach

Kappad (Kappakkadavu) Beach is located 16 km to the north of Kozhikode along the Kannur road at Pookkad. Apart from the fact that it is a rocky beach with high potential for tourism, it is the site where Vasco Da Gama landed on 27 May 1498 with three vessels and 170 men. A monument erected here commemorates this event. An ancient temple on a hillock, facing the sea, is an added attraction.

Beypore
Beypore is a small port town situated 10 km south of Kozhikode at the mouth of Chaliyar river. Beypore is known for its ancient shipbuilding industry that constructed the Uru, trading vessels more popular during the medieval periods and still used by the Arabs and others for commerce and tours. The place was formerly known as Vaypura and Vadaparappanad. Tippu Sultan named the town "Sultan Pattanam". It is one of the important ports of Kerala and has been a major trading centre for 1.061centuries. The dilapidated Kovilakam (palace) of the Parappanad Rajas and a small Basheer Museum (former house of the writer Vaikom Muhammad Basheer) can be found here. Towards the sea shore is a big complex that includes a port, a boat yard, a fish landing platform, breakwater project, marine ware shop, ship- breaking unit, etc. There are two man-made extensions to the sea to facilitate easy access for fishing boats. The 2 km breakwater made of stone is another attraction. The Beypore Lighthouse is located to the south of the Chaliyar. The Marine Cemetery, an awareness monument dedicated to endangered fish species, is located at the Beypore beach.

KIRTADS
This unique museum houses the tools and devices used by the ancient tribal communities of Kerala. A good library with books on anthropology and sociology is an added attraction. It is in Chevayur.around 7 km from calicut city. The major studies related to tribes, welfare programmes and trainings are conducted by KIRTADS. KIRTADS means Kerala Institute for Research, Training And Development of Scheduled Castes and Scheduled Tribes.

Thusharagiri Falls
Thusharagiri Falls is a waterfall in Chembukadavu Thusharagiri offers endless scope for trekking, rock climbing and wildlife sanctuary visits. It is around 50 kilometres (31 mi) from Kozhikode. The nearest town Kodencherry is around 11 kilometres (6.8 mi) from Thusharagiri. The other main towns situated here are Thiruvambady and Thamarassery.

Other places of interest
 Art gallery and Krishna Menon Museum at East Hill, Kozhikode
Deepanjali lamp museum, One and Only Lamp Museum in India.
 Kadalundi Bio Reserve, home to migratory birds
 Lalitha Kala Academy, behind town hall, Kozhikode
 Jawaharlal Nehru Planetarium
 Mishkal Mosque, a historic Mosque built 650 years ago
 Lokanarkavu Temple, a temple dedicated to the goddess Durga, is in Memunda. The temple is 4 km from Vatakara. It is often associated with the martial art Kalarippayattu.
 Kozhippara waterfalls is located at the eastern side of the district and offers a good trekking experience.
Sultan Bathery: The major hill station of Malabar. The distance to Sultan Bathery is 98 km.
 Peruvannamuzhi dam: There are boat services and a crocodile sanctuary. The Experimental Farm of the Indian Institute of Spices Research maintains large collections of black pepper, ginger, turmeric, nutmeg, clove, cinnamon and garcinia here.
 Kakkayam dam and hydroelectric power station. Also an ideal location for treks.
Beypore Pulimood  
Attractions in Vatakara

 Kunjali Marakkar Meusium
 Sandbanks Beach
 Payamkutti Mala
 Lokanarkav Temple
Kappad Beach

Temples
 Pisharikavu Temple
Sree Pisharikavu Temple is situated at Kollam, Koyilandy. The festival (ulsavam) of Pisharikavu is known as the Pooram in Malabar.The annual festival of Sri Pisharikavu Temple is celebrated in the Malayala month of "Meenam". The festival is celebrated with pomp for 8 days. The 7th day is celebrated as "Valiya Vilaku", and the 8th day is celebrated as "Kaliyattom", on which the divine Nandhakam sword is brought in procession around the temple on 7th and 8th day on a fully decorated female elephant, and traditional art form of Kerala is also staged in the temple. The Navarathri is also celebrated in a big way in the temple..
 Lokarnakavu 
 The Lokanarkavu situated at Memunda, 5 km from Vatakara, is a popular temple of North Malabar. This temple is associated with the heroes and heroines of Vadakkanpattu. In the vicinity of the temple there are three rock-cut caves. There are candid murals and carvings adorning the caves. The main deity is Goddess Durga. The festival, locally called Pooram, is celebrated during March/April. The temple is 1500 years old. There are two temples adjacent to the Lokanarkavu with Vishnu and Shiva as deities. Lokanarkavu goddess is named as Lokanarkavilamma which was the dearest god of Thacholi Othenan, a celebrated hero of Kadathanadu.
 Payam Kuttimala Temple 
 Lord Muthappan temple situated in Memunda at scenic hill top which have been now taken care by Tourism department of Kerala Government. Temple opens only at evening. Lots of people come here to watch the sunset. 'Theyyam' is a legendary art performed at Payamkuttimala temple which attract people worldwide.
 Chennamangalam Temple 
 Considered as one of oldest temples in Kerala, and also one of the very few temples which has Dhwaja Prathishta.This is situated 2 km from town and is near to Chorode.The main prathista is Lord Shiva and Lord Ayyappa.This temple is also known as second Sabarimala. Few years back there was a Big fire in Sabarimala and many people were not able to go there. At this time many people came to this temple.
 Kozhukkannur Neyyamruth Madom 
 Kozhukkannur Neyyamruth Madom is located at Purameri, is said to have a history of more than 100 years.  The madom relates to the Kotiyoor festival, and is a centre from where the Neyamruthu [Ghee] offerings are taken to the Kotiyoor temple by walk.
 Kizhakkedathu temple 
Shivapuram Sree Mahadeva Kshethram
Sri Thrikkudamanna Temple, Mukkam 
The second most people gathered Shivaratri Festival in Kerala and 1st in Malabar, this Temple is situated in the centre of Eruvanjipuzha (Eruvanji River) dedicated to Lord Shivadeva.

Kunjali Marakkar Memorial
The Marakkars were admirals of the Zamorins, who valiantly resisted the Portuguese on the high seas. Kunhali Marakkar built a fort on the southern bank of the Moorad river. This fort was completely destroyed by the Portuguese at a later time. The place where the fort stood is known today as Kottakkal, 46 km south of Kozhikode. A small hut that belonged to Kunhali Marakkar with collections of ancient swords, cannonballs and knives can be seen here.

Sand banks

A small peninsula with the Moorad river on the east and the Arabian Sea on the west is located approximately 3 km towards the south of the town. This area is known as the Sandbanks. The Peninsula has a building called the Sandbanks Bungalow, which was built by Mr Wilfred Vincent Reilly in the year 1946. This bungalow and the land it stands on was sold on 04 Feb 1966 to Grasim Industries Ltd a company of the Aditya Birla Management Corporation Ltd, and is owned by the company till date. Adjacent to the bungalow is an open area which was previously under lease with Grasim Industries Ltd but was returned to the Government of Kerala in 2002. This area is now developed by the Harbour Dept of Government of Kerala and has been handed over to Vatakara Municipality for maintenance. Construction work of coastal Police Station building is continuing there. Many tourists visit this place for a view of the sunset.

Peruvannamuzhi Dam
Peruvannamuzhi Dam is situated near Kuttiady. This is an attraction for tourists and students.

Craft Village
An Initiative of Dept of Tourism, Govt of Kerala
Sargaalaya, the art & craft village at Iringal is designed as an initiative to put Kerala's traditional arts & crafts on the tourism trail. The craft village is set up on 20 acres of land on the banks of the Moorad River, just 200 meters off Kozhikode – Kannur National Highway near Vatakara. The craft village has 27 cottages where, a hundred or even more artisans can work. Apart from showcasing crafts & craftsmen from across Kerala, Sargaalaya has a Crafts Design & Technology development centre that provides training for craftsmen on the latest techniques of production & encourages innovation in the traditional system.

Attractions in Koyilandy
 Kollam Parappally Makham (Muslim Dargah) of Thameemul Ansari and the other predecessors of Islamic prophet Muhammad - 2.5 km from Koyilandy Railway Station
 Cheriyamangad Kottayil Shree Durga Bhagavathy Temple 
 Pulimuttu (Easy Access to Fishing Boats to Shore)
 Sree kidarathil thalachillon devi temple kanayankode
 Thalachilion Temple Kanayankode
 Valiyakath (Masjid & Dargha Makham) - Beach Road Koyilandy
 Kollam Sree Pisharikavu Temple - Kollam
 Sargalaya - Craft Village, Iringal
 Mangrove musium, Koyilandy
 Driving Beach, Thikkodi, Koyilandy
 Kadaloor Light house, Nandi, Koyilandy

Attractions in Kuttiady
The Kuttiady River:- Rising from the Narikota Ranges on the western slopes of the Wynad Hills a part of Western Ghats at an elevation of 1220 m M.S.L. of the Kuttiady River flows through Badagara, Koyilandy and Kozhikode Taluks. The river is also known as the Murat River. This river has a length of 74 km. It falls into the Arabin Sea at Moorad about 6 km from Vatakara and along with its tributaries it drains in area of 583 km2.

The major tributaries of the river are the Onipuzha, the Thottilpalampuzha the Kadiyangad puzha thevannathilpuzha and the Madappallipuzha. The river passes through Oorakuzhi Kuttiady. Traveler, Muyippoth, Maniyur and Karuvacheri. The historical Kottakkal Forest is situated at the mouth of the river.

Peruvannamoozhi Dam 
Kuttiady Peruvannamuzhi Dam is situated in a small village approximately 60 km from Kozhikode. You could reach by a two-hour journey. It is situated in the north- East direction of Calicut city. There is an artificial lake in Peruvannamuzhi.

There is also a crocodile farm and a bird sanctuary situated here at Peruvannamuzhi. There are more than twenty crocodiles here in different pools. The bird sanctuary also offers birds of more than 90 species. The Peacocks of Peruvannamuzhi is famous. But it is now considered as vulnerable species. The Peruvannamuzhi dam belongs to the Kuttiady irrigation project. The water stored here is used for the production of electricity as well as for irrigation. This Peruvannamuzhi Dam is used for providing water to three main districts- Kozhikode, Malapuram and Kannur.

Peruvannamuzhi Dam also serves water for the Japan Govt. Aided Drinking Water Project. Long tunnels runs from here for the purpose of provide drinking water to secluded villages of Kozhikode district.

There is also an institution running here Indian Institution for Spice Research. They were responsible for the production of varies varieties of seeds and saplings here. Kuttiady Agricultural farm is also located at Peruvannamuzhi. The tourists can also visit one of the old churches of Kozhikode district, Fathima Matha Catholic Church. The headquarters of Shalom, a popular television channel is also located at Peruvannamuzhi.
Location of Peruvannamuzhi Dam-The Peruvannamuzhi Dam is 60 km from the Kozhikode city.

Temples, Kuttiady
There are number of temples in kutiady. "Natol thira" and associated carnival along with "thira" is famous. Kutiady carnival is also called " Kannukali chanda" a place where people exchange or buy cow, bull, goat etc. The carnival is happening every year first week of January. One temple is recently identified near Kuttiady during an excavation, which was buried during Tipu Sultan's invasion in Malabar.

Kutiady has many God Siva's temples, god subramanyan temple, god Vishnu temple etc.

Paduvileri tharavad, one of the oldest Nair families in the area, still conducts an annual 'thira' (which is fully privately managed) at a place called Mangott about 2 km from Kuttiady.

Echo tourism Project
Kutiady echo tourism project is based on the sound natural wealth of Janaki Kadu forest at Panthirikkara. The Janaki kadu is 10 km from Peruvannamuzhi dam.

References

 
Lists of tourist attractions in Kerala
K